The 2020–21 Arizona State Sun Devils men's ice hockey season was the 6th season of play for the program at the Division I level. The Sun Devils represented Arizona State University and were coached by Greg Powers, in his 11th season.

Season
Due to the COVID-19 pandemic, the start of the Sun Devils' season was delayed. Due to scheduling problems resulting from the pandemic, Arizona State entered into a scheduling alliance with the Big Ten and would play a conference schedule. The Sun Devils would only participate in regular season games against Big Ten teams, the program would not formally join the conference nor would any of its games be counted in the Big Ten standings. Arizona State would also not be eligible for the Big Ten Tournament.

Due to the nature of their agreement, Arizona State played all of its games on the road. That, and playing against stronger competition that previous years, led to the Sun Devils' facing an uphill battle in their pursuit of a second NCAA berth. In ASU's first series of the season they were swept by Michigan but were dealt a serious blow when senior captain and all-time leading goal scorer, Johnny Walker, suffered a knee injury that would keep him out for 6 weeks. After another offensively inept series, the Sun Devils suddenly came to life against Wisconsin, taking both games and jumping back into the USCHO rankings.

The team played well in Walker's absence, ending the year with a 4–6–2 record, but when their captain returned the team was in the middle of a string of ranked opponents. For the entire month of January, Arizona State played top-20 teams. When the dust settled, ASU's record had plummeted and the team had virtually no chance of making the national tournament. The team played well over the final three weeks of the season but they couldn't recover from a disastrous 1–7 run.

Departures

Recruiting

Roster
As of January 3, 2021.

|}

Standings

Schedule and Results

|-
!colspan=12 style=";" | Regular Season

Scoring Statistics

Goaltending statistics

Rankings

USCHO did not release a poll in week 20.

Players drafted into the NHL

2021 NHL Entry Draft

† incoming freshman

References

Arizona State Sun Devils men's ice hockey seasons
Arizona State Sun Devils
Arizona State Sun Devils
Arizona State Sun Devils
2021 in sports in Arizona
2020 in sports in Arizona